Cambridge United Football Club is a professional association football club based in the city of Cambridge, England. They compete in EFL League One, the third tier of the English football league system. The stadium has a capacity of 8,127, made up of terracing and seated areas.

The club was founded in 1912 as Abbey United, and took the name Cambridge United in 1951. They played in local amateur leagues before joining the Southern League after finishing as runners-up of the Eastern Counties League in 1957–58. Under Bill Leivers's stewardship they were crowned Southern League Premier Division champions in 1968–69 and 1969–70, which helped to secure their election into the  Football League in 1970. They won promotion out of the Fourth Division in 1972–73, but suffered immediate relegation. They won the Fourth Division title in 1976–77, and then secured promotion out of the Third Division the following season. They remained in the Second Division for six seasons, before they suffered consecutive relegations.

Manager John Beck led United to promotion out of the Fourth Division via play-offs in 1990 and then the Third Division title in 1990–91, with the club reaching the Second Division play-offs the following season. Two relegations in three years left Cambridge United back in the fourth tier, before promotion was secured at the end of the 1998–99 campaign. They entered the Conference in 2005, after two relegations in four seasons, where they remained for nine seasons. They finished as Conference runners-up three times, being beaten in the play-off finals in 2008 and 2009, before eventually securing promotion after winning the 2014 play-off final. After spending seven seasons in League Two, Cambridge United were promoted to League One as runners-up, in 2021, under Mark Bonner.

Although the club has traditionally worn amber and black at home, it has experimented with a number of designs of shirts including plain amber with black trim, amber and black squares, stripes and, amber with a black sash. The club had close links with Cambridge Regional College, a team that operated as a de facto reserve team between 2006 and 2014. The Cambridge United Community Trust perform a lot of charity work in the local community.

History

Formation and early years
The club was founded in 1912 as Abbey United, named after the Abbey district of Cambridge. A club called Cambridge United existed in Cambridge from 1909, but it was not linked to the club that exists today. The club played in local amateur leagues for many of its early years, moving from ground to ground around Cambridge (see Stadium below) before settling at the Abbey Stadium. In 1949 the club turned professional, and changed its name to Cambridge United in 1951. They played in the Eastern Counties League until finishing as runners-up in 1957–58, which saw them promoted to the Southern League. Three years later, Cambridge United reached the Premier Division of the Southern League.

First League era: 1970–2005

After election to the Football League in 1970, to replace Bradford (Park Avenue), the club was promoted from the Fourth Division after three seasons, but went straight back down.

Following the appointment of Ron Atkinson as manager, Cambridge United won successive promotions which took them into the Second Division in 1978 – a mere eight years after joining the Football League. Atkinson had gone to West Bromwich Albion, a First Division club, in January 1978, and was succeeded by John Docherty, who oversaw the second promotion.

Cambridge United peaked at eighth place in the Second Division in 1980. However, a terrible season in 1983–84 (setting a league record for most successive games without a win, 31, which was surpassed by Derby County in 2008) was followed by a further relegation in 1984–85 (equalling the then league record for most losses in a season, 33). These successive relegations, which also had a negative effect on the club's attendances as well as its finances, placed Cambridge United back in the Fourth Division, the lowest professional league in English football at the time. They had to apply for re-election in their first season back in the Fourth Division, and promotion would not be achieved for another four years.

The early 1990s was the U's most successful period. Soon after the appointment of new manager John Beck, the club won the first ever appearance as a professional club at Wembley Stadium, the Fourth Division playoff final in May 1990, which secured promotion to the Third Division – the club's first promotion for 12 years. Dion Dublin scored the only goal in a game against Chesterfield. Under Beck, United gained promotion from the Fourth Division and had already reached the FA Cup quarter finals in 1990, and reached them again a year later, and winning the Third Division in 1991. United reached the play-offs in 1992, after finishing 5th in the Second Division, but failed in their bid to become founder members of the Premier League. This was the club's highest final league placing to date. The following season the club sacked John Beck and were relegated from the new First Division. Further relegation followed two seasons later. United returned to Division Two but were relegated in 2002 despite a successful run in the Football League Trophy which saw them reach the final which they lost 1–4 to Blackpool at the Millennium Stadium in Cardiff.

In 2005, after 35 years in the Football League, Cambridge United were relegated into the Football Conference. This brought with it financial difficulties and the club filed for administration on 29 April. On 22 July 2005 the club came out of administration with a deal being struck with HM Revenue and Customs at the eleventh hour after the intervention of then sports minister Richard Caborn. Cambridge had sold their Abbey Stadium home earlier in the season for £1.9 million to keep the club afloat.

In the Conference: 2005–2014

On the eve of the 2006–07 season, it was announced that former Norwich City striker Lee Power would be the club's new chairman taking over from Brian Attmore's caretaking reign. Johnny Hon was also to rejoin the board as vice-chairman after John Howard's resignation on conflict of interests grounds (owing to his ownership of Bideawhile 445 Ltd, United's landlords). Jimmy Quinn was appointed manager soon after Power took charge and, after a difficult settling-in period which included a humiliating 5–0 loss to local rivals Histon, he guided Cambridge United away from another possible relegation by achieving five wins from their last seven games of the season.

After signing several respected and experienced players at the non-league level in the following close season Quinn led Cambridge to their then longest ever unbeaten start to a season (2007–08), which stretched to twelve games. Off the field, United reported several major sponsorship deals which seemed to point towards increased financial security. Halfway through the season the chairman, Lee Power, resigned. He was replaced by Wayne Purser. United finished the season in 2nd place, qualifying for the play-offs. They beat Burton Albion in the semi-final, 4–3 on aggregate, but lost 1–0 to Exeter City in the final, played at Wembley Stadium.

Following the play-off defeat many players left the club, culminating in the departure of manager Jimmy Quinn. Quinn was succeeded by former Southport manager Gary Brabin, who appointed Paul Carden as player-assistant manager. United finished the 2008–09 season again 2nd in the league, and also again reached the play-off final, overturning a 3–1 deficit to beat Stevenage Borough 4–3 on aggregate in the semi-final; however, they were beaten again at Wembley Stadium, 2–0 by Torquay United. Brabin was named as the Conference's Manager of the Season, but was sacked in the close-season after reportedly falling out with the chairman. He was replaced by Martin Ling, who resigned just eight days into the job, before the start of the 2009–10 season and was followed days later by chairman George Rolls. The new board re-appointed Ling as manager the following week.

Cambridge finished Ling's first season in 10th place – not enough for a playoff place. The following season, on 6 January 2011, with Cambridge in a similar position to where they finished the previous season, the club's owners put the club up for sale citing the need for new funds to take the club forward. Despite interest being expressed from a number of parties, no new owner has yet been found. Later the same month, the club's landlords Grosvenor Group revealed the plans for a new community stadium, including potential new locations both within the city and outside it. At the start of 2011 Martin Ling was removed from his position as manager and replaced on a temporary basis by CRC manager Jez George. He managed to steer the club towards safety, finishing 17th, which led to George's role being made permanent. After having rebuilt the squad with players from the club's youth system and with astute signings in Harrison Dunk and Tom Shaw, George managed to lead Cambridge to a 9th-place finish, a huge improvement on their previous season. As well as the league, Jez George also took Cambridge to the quarter-final of the FA Trophy (which was the furthest they had reached at the time), but lost 2–1 at home to minnows, Wealdstone. Eleven games into the following season Jez George became Director of Football, and Richard Money was announced as the new head coach of the club. The club spent much of the season in mid-table, finishing in 14th position with 59 points. The squad was greatly revamped, and United started 2013–14 with a record-breaking 16 games unbeaten. Cambridge finished the season in second place, qualifying for the play-offs. After beating FC Halifax Town 2–1, on aggregate, in the semi-final, they won 2–1 against Gateshead in the final, held at Wembley Stadium, gaining promotion back to the Football League after a nine-year absence. The club also reached their first FA Trophy final, held at Wembley Stadium, where they beat Gosport Borough 4–0.

2014–present: Back in The Football League 

In their first season back in the Football League, Cambridge United progressed to the fourth round of the FA Cup, where they drew at home with Premier League team Manchester United. The match at the Abbey Stadium ended in a goalless draw, forcing a replay at Old Trafford, which Manchester United won 3–0. In the league, Cambridge finished 19th with 51 points, 10 points above the relegation zone. The following season started poorly, and Richard Money was sacked in November 2015, to be replaced by Shaun Derry the same month. A six-match unbeaten run saw Derry win the League Two Manager of the Month award for December 2015, and the U's finished the league in 9th place with 68 points. They finished 2016–17 season in 11th place, in a season that took in extended runs of both good and poor form. Derry was dismissed in February 2018 and was replaced on a permanent basis by his assistant, Joe Dunne, on the final day of 2017–18.

Cambridge started 2018–19 poorly, and manager Dunne was dismissed after 20 games with the club in 21st place. Colin Calderwood was appointed as his replacement in December 2018. Cambridge's second half under Calderwood was more successful, however, they could only finish in 21st place, only six points clear of the relegation zone. Following a successful start to the 2019–20 season, Calderwood was offered a new contract. However, after three heavy defeats in one month, Calderwood was sacked following a 4–0 defeat to Salford City. With the U's in 18th place, Calderwood's assistant manager Mark Bonner was placed in temporary charge until the end of the season. Under Bonner, Cambridge won four from their final seven matches before the disruption caused by the COVID-19 pandemic forced the cancellation of the season. Final league positions were decided on a points per game basis with Cambridge finishing in 16th place. This good form resulted in Bonner being handed the permanent role of head coach. During the 2020–21 season, Bonner guided Cambridge to promotion from League Two as runners-up after seven seasons in that division. Promotion was clinched on the final day with an emphatic 3–0 victory over Grimsby Town. Following this success, Bonner was handed a new three-year contract.

On the 3rd of September 2022, a statement released by the club announced that investment from the clubs owners had allowed it to purchase the ground back from Grosvenor, ending a 20 year spell of being tenants at The Abbey and the clubs home for 89 years.

Colours and badge

Cambridge United have traditionally worn amber and black home kits in a variety of designs, including plain amber with black trim (e.g. 1979–1991), amber and black quarters (1996–1998) and halves (e.g. 1924–25), and a variety of stripes (e.g. 1926–1936. Only between 1957–1960 and 1970–1972 have shirts not been predominantly amber, when the club opted for white with a small amber and black detail on the shirt's sleeves. Away from home, kits have often been white with some amber and/or black detail, although recently shirts have been blue at the request of the away shirts sponsors, Kershaw.

A sponsor first appeared on a Cambridge United shirt for the 1985–86 season when the shirt was changed mid-season from plain amber to amber and black stripes. Spraymate were the club's first shirt sponsor, and have since been followed by an array of local and national companies: Lynfox, Howlett, Fujitsu, Beaumont Stainless Steels, Premier Travel, C and R Windows, Quicksilver (couriers), Capital Sports, The Global Group, Haart, Global Self Drive, and in 2009–10 Greene King IPA.

The teams kits have been manufactured by a number of companies, with Admiral providing the first strip on which a maker's logo appeared. The club have subsequently worn kits created by, among others, Nike, Patrick, Sporta and, Vandanel, with the latter providing the strip for the 2007–08 season  and subsequently an amber shirt featuring a dramatic black sash design that polarised the opinions of fans. In the summer of 2010 the Club parted company with Vandanel, citing concerns regards the company's ability to continue to service their needs, signing a deal with Italian company Erreà. For the start of the 2013–14 season, The U's signed a deal with Genesis Sports to provide Puma teamwear for the club. This deal has been continued into the 2014–15 season and saw the home shirts make a return to amber and black stripes. Since the beginning of the 2019-2020 Campaign they have switched to Sportswear Company Hummel

The club's current crest, a large football over which the letters 'CU' are emblazoned, with three turrets on top, has been worn on its shirts since the 1986–87 season, with a brief change to a more 'elaborate' design between 1996 and 1998. Previously, shirts had simply been embroidered with the club's acronym 'CUFC' or a 'Book & Ball' badge used during the late 1970s. The club used a special badge to commemorate their centenary in the 2012–13 season.

Stadium

Cambridge United currently play their home matches at the Abbey Stadium, which has been their home since 1932. The stadium is located in the Abbey area of the city on Newmarket Road, approximately 3 kilometres (1.8miles) east of the city centre. The stadium currently has a capacity of 8,127, of which 4,376 are seated. Due to sponsorship reasons, the ground has also been known as The R. Costings Abbey Stadium and the Cambs Glass Stadium.

Before opening the Abbey with a victory over Cambridge University Press in a friendly on 31 August 1932, United had played matches at a number of venues around the city. When playing under the Abbey United name, games were played on Midsummer Common until the outbreak of World War I. When the war ended, the club moved to Stourbridge Common and, after promotion to the Cambridgeshire League Division One in 1923, moved once again to land just off Newmarket Road in Cambridge. This ground, affectionately known as the 'Celery Trenches' due to the poor state of the pitch, was christened with a 1–0 league victory over Histon Institute and became United's home for a decade. While based at the Trenches, the club established its offices at the 'Dog & Pheasant' pub on Newmarket Road, which it used as an away dressing room on matchdays, as well as a store for equipment including the pitch's goalposts. However, the Cambridgeshire FA were unhappy with the state of the pitch at this new home, and the club moved to Parker's Piece at the start of the 1930–31 season. Despite the special significance of Parker's Piece in the history of football, it being the first place where the Cambridge Rules were played out, the lack of spectator capacity and disruption caused during games meant this move was not a successful one.

In January 2006, John Howard announced plans to move out of the Abbey Stadium to a new purpose-built stadium in Milton. This was supported by Cambridgeshire Horizons. These were criticised by fans as risking the club's identity by moving out of the city and, despite Howard describing them as crucial to the club's future, little else was heard of them publicly. Subsequently, a new community stadium, that would also include conference facilities, was ruled out by a Planning Inspector's report which described it as unsuitable development in the green belt and in October 2009, Cambridge United announced its intentions to redevelop the Abbey Stadium with chairman.

The Stadium was sold by Bideawhile to Grosvenor Estates in June 2010. Soon after, the new landlords, in combination with the club and supporters group Cambridge Fans United, announced that they had signed a Memorandum of Understanding to positively work together to achieve the relocation of the club to a new stadium. In January 2011, plans for a new community stadium were unveiled at an open meeting, including potential new locations both within the city and outside it.

A final site, at Trumpington Meadows, was agreed upon and initial plans for an 8,000 capacity stadium were put forward, as part of a "Cambridge Sporting Village" incorporating housing and retail development.  Objections from residents and local councils saw the proposal blocked in 2013, and plans announced in January 2015 keep the sporting village development at Trumpington, but without the new stadium. Instead Cambridge United will redevelop the Abbey Stadium. First plans were presented in May 2015, which would increase capacity of the Newmarket Road End, incorporating safe standing, complete redevelopment of the Habbin Terrace and slight expansion to the Main Stand.

Cambridge United bought back the Abbey Stadium in September 2022, and restarted planning for expansion and improvement of the ground.

Supporters

Cambridge United have a number of supporters' groups and associations, some of which are independently run and some are run by the club itself. These include: an Away Travel Club, who provide travel to every away game as well as hosting fundraising events and sponsoring senior players; youth group Junior U's; Cambridge United Supporters Association, a group giving a voice to the fans in communications with the club and the media; Vice-presidents Club, who offer match day hospitality packages; and regional associations in St Ives, East Cambridgeshire, Royston, St Neots, Bedfordshire and Saffron Walden.
Cambridge Fans United is an independent supporters group who are now a significant shareholder in the club with representation on the fans' behalf on the board of directors. In addition to these supporters' groups, the club currently has one independent fanzine, United in Endeavour, which raises funds for Cambridge Fans United and is sold at home games.

During their time in the Conference, attendances at the Abbey were amongst the highest in the league. Cambridge United's first two seasons in the Conference saw them post the fourth-highest average attendance figures in both years (2,607 in 2005–06 and 2,815 in 2006–07). They had the third-highest attendances in their final season in the Conference, averaging 3,085 for 2013–14.

Rivalries
Prior to election into the Football League, Cambridge City were regarded as the club's biggest rivals, although the rivalry has since waned significantly. Peterborough United are considered to be their current main rivals, something that was recognised in a survey by the Football Fans Census as a reciprocated feeling, despite the fact the two clubs have experienced many seasons in separate divisions. Other lesser rivalries include those with Northampton Town, Colchester United, Luton Town, and Stevenage.

Players

Current squad

Out on loan

Reserves and Centre of Excellence
Before relegation from the Football League in 2005, Cambridge United entered a reserve team in the Football Combination. However, this ceased following financial difficulties which meant the club could not guarantee being able to put out a team for every game. In 2006 United formed Cambridge Regional College as a de facto reserve team and entered them in the Eastern Counties League Premier Division. FA rules prohibit reserve teams playing at certain levels of the football pyramid, and so the CRC name was adopted in recognition of the college's financial support, and because the team is made up almost entirely of the college's students.

Cambridge United's Centre of Excellence is widely regarded throughout professional football circles as one of the best in England. Many players have come through the youth team to establish themselves as first team players at Cambridge (for example Dan Gleeson, Daniel Chillingworth, Robbie Willmott and Josh Coulson) and go on to play at a higher level (recent examples include John Ruddy, Michael Morrison and Josh Simpson). Wales international Jack Collison was in the youth squads for several years before joining West Ham United's youth academy after the centre closed down following relegation to the Conference Premier.

The youth team won their division of the Football League Youth Alliance in both 2003–04 and 2004–05, showing the strength of the club's Centre of Excellence. The club's success in the FA Youth Cup in recent years has also far surpassed its expectation given the level of the parent club – in 2006–07 the team was the highest placed non-league team reaching the Fourth Round after seven games (including qualifying games).

Notable former players
 For all former players with a Wikipedia article see :Category:Cambridge United F.C. players

Notable players include Wilf Mannion, the only former Cambridge United player to be inducted into the English Football Hall of Fame, former Charlton Athletic manager Les Reed, Brian Moore, former West Ham United player who scored a club record 68 goals in 1957–58 despite blindness in one eye, and Lindsey Smith, voted Cambridge United's all-time cult hero in a poll for BBC Sport's Football Focus in August 2004.

Club management

Club staff

Managerial history

Since joining the Football League in 1970, Cambridge United has had twenty-five full-time managers as well as many caretakers and player-managers.

Honours and achievements

League 

Third Division / League One (Tier 3)
Champions (1): 1990–91 
Runners-up (1): 1977–78

Fourth Division / League Two (Tier 4)
Champions (1): 1976–77 
Runners-up (2): 1998–99, 2020–21
Promotion (1): 1972–73
Play-off winners (1): 1989–90

National League (Tier 5)
Play-off winners (1): 2013–14
Play-off finalists (2): 2007–08, 2008–09

Southern League Premier Division (old fifth tier)
Winners (2): 1968–69, 1969–70

Cups 

FA Trophy
Winners (1): 2013–14

Football League Trophy
Runners-up (1): 2001–02

Southern League Cup
Winners (1): 1968–69

Club records

Scorelines
Biggest League Win:
 7 – 0 (v Morecambe, League Two, 19 April 2016)
 7 – 0 (v Weymouth, Conference Premier, March 2007)
7 – 0 (v Forest Green Rovers, Conference Premier, September 2009)
Biggest Cup Win:
5 – 1 (v Bristol City, FA Cup 5th Round Second Replay, February 1990)
4 – 0 (v Sheffield Wednesday, FA Cup 5th Round, February 1991)
4–0 (v Coventry City FA Cup 2nd Round, December 2016)
Biggest League Defeat:
 0 – 7 (v Luton Town, League Two, November 2017)
Biggest Cup Defeat:
0 – 7 (v Sunderland, League Cup Second Round, October 2002)

Players
Most goals in one game: 5 – Steve Butler (v Exeter City, April 1994)
Most League appearances: 416 – Steve Spriggs (1975–1987)
Most League goals in one season: 32 – Paul Mullin (EFL League Two, 2020–21)
Youngest player: Ben Worman – 16 years (v Peterborough United, 7 November 2017)
Oldest player: John Taylor – 39 years (during 2003–04 season)
Highest transfer fee paid: £190,000 – Steve Claridge (from Luton Town, November 1992)
Highest transfer fee received: £1,500,000 – Trevor Benjamin (to Leicester City, July 2000)

Club
Highest league finish: 5th in Football League Second Division (second tier)
Best FA Cup performance: Quarter-finalists, 1989–90, 1990–91
Best League Cup performance: Quarter-finalists, 1992–93
Best EFL Trophy performance: Runners-up, 2001–02
Best FA Trophy performance: Winners, 2013–14
Most League Points in a Season: 86 (Division Three, 1990–91), (Conference, 2007–08 & 2008–09)
Most League Goals in a Season: 87 (Division Four, 1976–77)
Record Attendance: 14,000 (v Chelsea, May 1970)

Charity (Cambridge United Community Trust)
Cambridge United Community Trust (CUCT) is the charity wing of Cambridge United Football Club.

CUCT was founded after Cambridge United were relegated from the Football League in 2005. The charity's stated mission is: "To place Cambridge United at the heart of a community where individuals respect each other and themselves, are empowered to maximise their potential and have the inspiration to fulfil this potential."

The charity operates in primary schools across Cambridgeshire including in a partnership with AstraZenenca. CUCT also delivers both health and inclusion work in the city of Cambridge.

The charity's current CEO is Ben Szreter.

Women's team
There is an affiliated women's team called Cambridge United WFC.

References

Further reading

External links

 The Cambridge United website: official website of the club
 Cambridge United news: Cambridge United news from Cambridge News
 Cambridge Fans United: website of Cambridge Fans United, the main fans' group associated with Cambridge United and a significant shareholder in the club

 
Association football clubs established in 1912
1912 establishments in England
Sport in Cambridge
Football clubs in England
East Anglian League
Eastern Counties Football League
Southern Football League clubs
National League (English football) clubs
Football clubs in Cambridgeshire
English Football League clubs
Companies that have entered administration in the United Kingdom